Passion is a one-act musical, with music and lyrics by Stephen Sondheim and a book by James Lapine. The story was adapted from Ettore Scola's 1981 film Passione d'Amore, and its source material, Iginio Ugo Tarchetti's 1869 novel Fosca. Central themes include love, sex, obsession, illness, passion, beauty, power and manipulation. Passion is notable for being one of the few projects that Stephen Sondheim himself conceived, along with Sweeney Todd and Road Show.

Set in Risorgimento-era Italy, the plot concerns a young soldier and the changes in him brought about by the obsessive love of Fosca, his Colonel's homely, ailing cousin.

Background and history
The story originally came from a 19th-century novel by Iginio Ugo Tarchetti, an experimental Italian writer who was prominently associated with the Scapigliatura movement. His book Fosca was a fictionalized recounting of an affair he'd once had with an epileptic woman when he was a soldier.

Sondheim first came up with the idea of writing a musical when he saw the Italian film in 1983:

As Fosca started to speak and the camera cut back to her, I had my epiphany. I realized that the story was not about how she is going to fall in love with him, but about how he is going to fall in love with her . . . at the same time thinking, "They're never going to convince me of that, they're never going to pull that off," all the while knowing they would, that Scola wouldn't have taken on such a ripely melodramatic story unless he was convinced that he could make it plausible. By the end of the movie, the unwritten songs in my head were brimming and I was certain of two things. First, I wanted to make it into a musical, the problem being that it couldn't be a musical, not even in my nontraditional style, because the characters were so outsized. Second, I wanted James Lapine to write it; he was a romantic, he had a feel for different centuries and different cultures, and he was enthusiastically attracted to weirdness.

As it turned out, Lapine was already exploring the idea of adapting Muscle, a memoir by Sam Fussell, for the musical stage. Together, they came up with the idea of a pair of double-billing one acts. Lapine wrote a couple of scenes and Sondheim had just started working on the opening number when he began to feel that his musical style was unsuitable for Muscle. The piece was more contemporary and, in his opinion, required a score reflecting pop sensibilities. He called up Lapine and suggested that he find another songwriter, perhaps William Finn, and include it as a companion piece. Meanwhile, they continued to work on Passion and as the piece grew, they found that it was enough to fill out an entire evening of theatre. Muscle was eventually shelved.

Productions

Original Broadway production
After 52 previews, Passion opened on Broadway at the Plymouth Theatre on May 9, 1994, and closed on January 7, 1995. Directed by James Lapine, the cast starred Jere Shea as Giorgio, Donna Murphy as Fosca and Marin Mazzie as Clara. Scenic design was by Adrianne Lobel, costume design by Jane Greenwood, lighting design by Beverly Emmons, and orchestrations by Jonathan Tunick. This production was filmed shortly after closing and televised on the Public Broadcasting Service series American Playhouse on September 8, 1996. (It was released on DVD in 2003 by Image Entertainment.)  The musical ran a total of 280 performances, making it the shortest-running musical ever to win the Tony Award for Best Musical.

The role of Fosca was originally offered to Patti LuPone, but she turned it down to star in Sunset Boulevard in the West End. LuPone was then famously fired from Sunset Boulevard in favor of Glenn Close, who would take the show to Broadway.

Original London production
The show opened in the West End, with significant musical and script revisions, at the Queen's Theatre in 1996. Directed by Jeremy Sams, the cast featured Michael Ball as Giorgio, Helen Hobson as Clara, and Maria Friedman as Fosca (Friedman had previously appeared in several Sondheim musicals in the UK). The production ran for 232 performances. A recording was later made of the show performed in concert, with nearly all of the original London cast recreating their roles and preserving the musical changes from the earlier production.

2010 London revival
A production at the Donmar Warehouse in London, as part of Stephen Sondheim's 80th birthday celebrations, opened on September 10, 2010, in previews, with the official opening September 21, running through November 27. It was directed by Jamie Lloyd, who was the Donmar associate director at the time, and the cast included Argentine actress Elena Roger, as well as Scarlett Strallen and David Thaxton.  This production won the Evening Standard Awards, Best Musical Award. David Thaxton won the Olivier Award for Best Actor in a Musical.

2011 premiere in Germany
Passion received its German-language premiere (translated by Roman Hinze) on January 28, 2011, at the Dresden State Operetta. Directed by Holger Hauer, the lead roles were filled by Marcus Günzel (Giorgio), Maike Switzer (Clara) and Vasiliki Roussi (Fosca). The choir and orchestra of the Dresden State Operetta performed under the musical direction of Peter Christian Feigel. A special feature of this production was its orchestral arrangement for a symphonic orchestra, including a great string ensemble, harpsichord and harp, with no electronic instruments being used and modifications to the musical score being made in cooperation with the composer. Passion ran at the Dresden State Operetta in the 2010–11 and 2011–12 seasons. The work was performed for the CD label “bobbymusic” from August 22 to 25, 2012 using the same performers. It is the first recording in German, and the first recording of the entire work with all of the musical numbers and spoken texts. Since December 2, 2013 the double CD has been on sale at the Dresden State Operetta (www.staatsoperette-dresden.de) as well as online (www.soundofmusic-shop.de or www.bobbymusic.de).

2013 Off-Broadway revival
The show was mounted by the East Village-based Classic Stage Company, starring Judy Kuhn as Fosca, Melissa Errico as Clara and Ryan Silverman as Giorgio. Known primarily for their stagings of classical plays, Passion was the first musical that the company had ever produced. The production was helmed by John Doyle and took a minimalist approach to the piece, though there were no instruments onstage. The run was extended through April 2013, and a two-disc cast recording was released on July 2 from PS Classics. Rebecca Luker, who played the role of Clara in the Kennedy Center's 2002 Sondheim Celebration production, replaced the ill Errico on this recording.

2016 Scandinavian premiere in Sweden
Passion received its Swedish-language premiere (translated by Ulricha Johnson) on September 17, 2016, at the Kulturhuset Spira. Directed by Victoria Brattström, the lead roles were portrayed by Kalle Malmberg (Giorgio), Mari Lerberg Fossum (Clara) and Annica Edstam (Fosca). The Jönköping Sinfonietta performed under the musical direction of Johan Siberg who also wrote the musical arrangements. The production had a second run at NorrlandsOperan in 2017.

Other productions
The musical made its regional premiere at New Line Theatre in St. Louis, MO in 1996, and was later part of the Sondheim Celebration at the Kennedy Center, running from July 19, 2002, through August 23, 2002, directed by Eric Schaeffer. Judy Kuhn and Michael Cerveris played Fosca and Giorgio, with Rebecca Luker as Clara.

The work was presented by the Minnesota Opera in February 2004, staged by Tim Albery and starring Patricia Racette as Fosca, William Burden as Giorgio and Evelyn Pollock as Clara.

In 2004 the show was performed in the Netherlands, and a Dutch-language recording was released—one of the few translations of a Sondheim score. This production had Vera Mann as Fosca, Stanley Burleson as Giorgio and Pia Douwes as Clara.

A semi-staged concert, starring Patti LuPone as Fosca, Michael Cerveris as Giorgio and Audra McDonald as Clara, was held at Lincoln Center in New York for three performances, March 30 – April 1, 2005. Directed by Lonny Price, this production was broadcast on the PBS television show Live from Lincoln Center on March 31, 2005. It won the Primetime Emmy Award for Outstanding Special Class Program. The score in this production preserved the musical revisions from the London version. This same cast had performed at the Ravinia Festival, Highland Park, Illinois, on August 22–23, 2003.

The show was done at Chicago Shakespeare Theater from October 2, 2007, to November 11, 2007, starring Ana Gasteyer as Fosca, Adam Brazier as Giorgio and Kathy Voytko as Clara.

The work was presented by Life Like Company at the Arts Centre Melbourne from November 5, 2014, to November 8, 2014, starring Theresa Borg as Fosca, Kane Alexander as Giorgio and Silvie Paladino as Clara.

The musical had its Italian premiere at the Cantiere Internazionale d'Arte of Montepulciano on July 12, 2019, directed by Keith Warner. The musical direction was by Roland Boer, and Janie Dee played Fosca.

The show was set to open in Pasadena, CA on March 15, 2020, directed by Michael Michetti at Boston Court Pasadena, but was postponed, and later cancelled, due to COVID-19 closures.

In a production produced by Ruthie Henshall who also stars as Fosca, Passion opened at the Hope Mill Theatre in Manchester on May 5, 2022.

Casts

Synopsis
The musical is usually presented in one act. An intermission was added only for the London production.

Act I

In Milan in 1863, two lovers are at the height of ecstasy ("Happiness"). The handsome captain, Giorgio, breaks their reverie by telling Clara that he is being transferred to a provincial military outpost. In the next scene, Giorgio is in the mess hall at the army camp with Colonel Ricci, the unit's commanding officer, and Dr. Tambourri, its physician. He thinks longingly of Clara (“First Letter”) and she thinks longingly of him ("Second Letter"). Giorgio's thoughts are interrupted by a bloodcurdling scream. The Colonel tells him not to worry; it's just Fosca, his sick cousin. Giorgio offers to lend her some of his books.

As he begins to adjust to the tedium of life at the outpost, the sensitive Giorgio feels increasingly out of place amongst the other men ("Third Letter"). He starts becoming friendly with the Doctor, who describes Fosca as having a nervous disorder. She frequently collapses into seizures, exposing her suffering and need for connection.

Fosca arrives after dinner to thank Giorgio for the books. When he suggests she keep a novel longer to meditate over it, she explains that she does not read to think or search for truth, but to live vicariously through the characters. She then goes off into a dark musing on her life ("I Read"). Giorgio awkwardly changes the subject, but when he observes a hearse pulling up, she is overtaken by a hysterical convulsion. Giorgio is stunned and appalled ("Transition").

The following afternoon, the Colonel, the Doctor, Giorgio and Fosca go for a walk together. As they stroll through a castle's neglected garden, Giorgio politely engages her in conversation while mentally narrating a letter to Clara. When Fosca confesses that she feels no hope in her life, he tells her that "the only happiness that we can be certain of is love." Fosca is hurt and embarrassed, but recognizes that Giorgio, like herself, is different from others, and asks for his friendship ("Garden Sequence").

Giorgio and Clara exchange letters about Fosca. Clara urges him to avoid her whenever possible. When Giorgio is preparing to take a five-day leave, Fosca shows up unexpectedly, dissolving into hysteria and begging him to return soon. Fosca is next seen reading, stone-faced, from a letter Giorgio has sent rejecting her feelings as he and Clara make love ("Trio").

Upon Giorgio's return, Fosca reproaches him. She demands to know about his affair and learns that Clara is married. In a sharp exchange, they agree to sever all ties. Weeks go by with no contact between them, but just as he is beginning to think that he is finally free of Fosca, he is informed by the Doctor that she is dying. His rejection of her love has exacerbated her illness. Giorgio, whose job as a soldier is to save lives, must go and visit her sickbed. He reluctantly agrees.

He enters Fosca's chamber, and she implores him to lie beside her while she sleeps. At daybreak, Fosca asks him for a favor before he leaves: "Write a letter for me." He complies, but the letter she imagines is a fantasy one from Giorgio to herself (“I Wish I Could Forget You”). She is seized by another convulsive attack, and he hastens from the room.

Act II

The soldiers gossip about Giorgio and Fosca while playing pool ("Soldiers' Gossip"). The Colonel thanks Giorgio for the kindness he has shown his cousin and explains her history. As a child, Fosca was doted on by her parents and once had illusions about her looks. When she was seventeen, the Colonel introduced her to an Austrian count named Ludovic. Fosca was taken with him, though she had her reservations. Once they were married, Ludovic took all of her family's money. Fosca eventually discovered that he had another wife and a child. When confronted, he smoothly admitted to his deception and vanished. It was then that Fosca first became ill. After her parents died, she went to live with the Colonel, who felt responsible for her circumstances ("Flashback").

Meanwhile, Clara has written Giorgio a letter ("Sunrise Letter") addressing her approaching age, in which she admits her fear of losing love when she is old and no longer beautiful. Giorgio makes his way to a desolate mountain and is in the midst of reading when Fosca appears. After Giorgio lashes out at her in anger ("Is This What You Call Love?"), she crumples and faints. He picks her up and carries her back in the rain.

The rain, the ordeal of getting Fosca back to camp and perhaps exposure to her contagious emotions have conspired to give Giorgio a fever. He falls into a slumber and dreams that Fosca is dragging him down into the grave ("Nightmare"). The Doctor sends him off to Milan on sick leave ("Forty Days"). As he boards the train, he is followed once again by Fosca. She apologizes for everything and promises to keep her distance for good. Giorgio pleads with her to give him up. She explains that this cannot happen. Her love is not a choice, it is who she is, and she would gladly die for him ("Loving You"). Giorgio is finally moved by the force of her emotions. He takes her back to the outpost ("Transition").

The Doctor warns Giorgio that he must stop seeing Fosca, that she threatens his mental and physical health. Giorgio requests to forgo his leave; he feels it his duty to stay and help her as much as he can. Back in Milan, Clara questions him jealously about Fosca. Giorgio asks Clara to leave her husband and start a new life with him, but as she has a child, she cannot.

During Christmas, Giorgio is told that he has been transferred back to military headquarters. Later on, he reads Clara's newest letter, in which she asks him to wait until her son is grown before planning a more serious commitment ("Farewell Letter"). Giorgio finds he no longer desires the carefully arranged, convenient affair that they shared ("Just Another Love Story").

Having discovered the letter Fosca dictated, the Colonel accuses Giorgio of leading her on and demands a duel. The Doctor attempts to mediate the two, but Giorgio insists on seeing her again. He realizes that he loves Fosca, for no one has ever truly loved him but her. That evening, he returns to Fosca's room, knowing that the physical act might very well kill her (“No One Has Ever Loved Me”). They embrace, their passion consummated at last.

The duel takes place the following morning behind the castle. Giorgio shoots at the Colonel and lets out a shrill howl eerily reminiscent of Fosca's earlier outbursts.

Months later, Giorgio is in a hospital, dazed, recovering from a nervous breakdown. He is told that Fosca died shortly after their night together; the Colonel recovered from the wound. Dreamlike, the other characters in the story reappear as Giorgio begins reading from Fosca's last letter. Gradually her voice joins his, and together they look back on their revelations ("Finale").

The company walks off, Fosca last, leaving Giorgio alone at his table.

Scenes and musical numbers
Note: No song titles appear in the program; titles below are from cast recordings.

Scene 1: Clara's bedroom in Milan
 Happiness – Clara and Giorgio
Scene 2: The dining quarters; Outdoors; The dining quarters
 First Letter ("Clara, I cried...") – Clara and Giorgio
 Second Letter ("Giorgio, I too have cried") – Clara and Giorgio
 Third Letter ("Clara, I'm in hell") – Clara, Giorgio and Soldiers
 Fourth Letter ("Yesterday I walked through the park...") – Clara
 I Read – Fosca
 Transition #1 ("How can I describe her?"/"The town – it is remote, isn't it?") – Giorgio/Soldiers
Scene 3: The castle garden
 Garden Sequence
 "All the while as we strolled..." – Giorgio, Clara
 "Love that fills every waking moment..." – Clara, Giorgio
 "To speak to me of love..." – Fosca
Scene 4: The dining quarters
 Three Days – Fosca
 Transition #2 ("All the time I watched from my room...") – Soldiers
Scene 5: The courtyard; Fosca's drawing room & Clara's bedroom
 Happiness – Trio (Fifth Letter) – Fosca, Giorgio, Clara
 Transition #3 ("I watched you from my window...") – Attendants
Scene 6: Fosca's Drawing Room; Doctor Tambourri's office
 Three weeks/"This is hell..." – Clara/Soldiers
Scene 7: Fosca's bedroom
 "God, you are so beautiful..." (Happiness) – Fosca
 I Wish I Could Forget You – Fosca, (Giorgio)
 Transition #4 ("How can I describe her? The wretchedness, the embarrassment.") – Soldiers
Scene 8: Billiard room; Outdoors; Flashback to Fosca's past
 Soldiers' Gossip #1 – Soldiers
Scene 9: Flashback to Fosca's past
 Flashback – Colonel Ricci, Fosca, Fosca's Mother, Fosca's Father, Ludovic, Mistress
Scene 10: The Mountainside, a distance from the outpost.
 Sunrise Letter – Clara and Giorgio
 Is This What You Call Love? – Giorgio
Scene 11: Parade ground; Giorgio's bedroom
 Soldiers' Gossip #2 – Soldiers
 Transition #5 – Nightmare ("Everywhere I turn...") – Group #1 and #2
Scene 12: A Train compartment to Milan; back at the Courtyard
 Transition #6 ("To feel a woman's touch...") – Major Rizolli
 Forty Days – Clara
 Loving You – Fosca
 Transition #7 ("How long were we apart") – Woman, Man
 Soldiers' Gossip #3 – Soldiers
Scene 13: Near the Milan Train Station
 "Giorgio, I didn't tell you in my letter" – Clara
Scene 14: A Christmas party at the dining quarters.
 La Pace Sulla Terra (Peace on Earth) – Lieutenant Torasso
 Farewell Letter – Clara
 Just Another Love Story (Happiness/Is This What You Call Love?) – Giorgio and Clara
Scene 15: Doctor Tambourri's office; Fosca's Bedroom
 No One Has Ever Loved Me (Extended) – Giorgio (to Dr. Tambourri) †
 No One Has Ever Loved Me – Giorgio (to Fosca)
 "All this happiness..." (Happiness – Reprise) – Fosca
Scene 16: An Open Field
 The Duel
Scene 17: A hospital
 Final Transition – Company
 Finale (Your Love Will Live In Me) – Giorgio, Fosca, Company
† Cut from the original Broadway production and then restored to 1996 London production.

Response and analysis
Passion was generally admired by critics for its ambition but savaged by theatregoers when it first opened. In particular, audiences were repelled by the characterization of Fosca. During previews, people would applaud whenever Fosca had a meltdown. In one performance, someone from the balcony yelled "Die, Fosca! Die!"

Stephen Sondheim believes that the musical is about how "the force of somebody's feelings for you can crack you open, and how it is the life force in a deadened world." In response to the hostility encountered during the early performances, he has said:

The story struck some audiences as ridiculous. They refused to believe that anyone, much less the handsome Giorgio, could come to love someone so manipulative and relentless, not to mention physically repellent, as Fosca. As the perennial banality would have it, they couldn't "identify" with the main characters. The violence of their reaction, however, strikes me as an example of "The lady doth protest too much." I think they may have identified with Giorgio and Fosca all too readily and uncomfortably. The idea of a love that's pure, that burns with D.H. Lawrence's gemlike flame, emanating from a source so gnarled and selfish, is hard to accept. Perhaps they were reacting to the realization that we are all Fosca, we are all Giorgio, we are all Clara.

In analyzing the musical, Michiko Kakutani of the New York Times wrote that Passion had "a lush, romantic score that mirrors the heightened, operatic nature of the story . . . Jonathan Tunick's orchestration plays an especially important role in lending the music a richness of texture and bringing out its sweeping melodic lines. The sets and lighting are warm and glowy and fervent, reminiscent of the colors of Italian frescoes and evocative of the story's intense, highly dramatic mood. Less a series of individual songs than a hypnotic net of music, the show's score traces the shifting, kaleidoscopic emotions of the characters, even as it draws the audience into the dreamlike world of their fevered passions."

Clive Barnes gave the musical a rave review: "Once in an extraordinary while, you sit in a theater and your body shivers with the sense and thrill of something so new, so unexpected, that it seems, for those fugitive moments, more like life than art. Passion is just plain wonderful — emotional and yes, passionate . . . Sondheim's music — his most expressive yet — glows and glowers, and Tunick has found the precise tonal colorations for its impressionistic moods and emotional overlays. From the start of his career, Sondheim has pushed the parameters of his art. Here is the breakthrough. Exultantly dramatic, this is the most thrilling piece of theater on Broadway."

The New York Times review of the original Broadway production described it as an "unalloyed love story . . . The score contains some insinuating melodies. You can hear madness in the ecstatic lilt." But ultimately, the reviewer felt that "the boldness of the enterprise never quite pays off. The musical leads an audience right up to the moment of transcendence but is unable in the end to provide the lift that would elevate the material above the disturbing."

In his review of the Off-Broadway revival, Ben Brantley wrote of it as "the most personal and internalized of Sondheim's works . . . Of all the directors who have staged Mr. Sondheim’s musicals, no one cuts closer to their heart than John Doyle, a minimalist with a scalpel. When it was first staged, in 1994, this concentrated portrait of a romantic triangle seemed to take place at a chilly, analytic remove. In contrast Mr. Doyle’s Passion comes across as a pulsing collective fever dream. And it reminds us that out of such dreams a startling clarity can emerge, almost painful in its acuteness . . . What follows is the gradual shift of Giorgio’s affections from the seductive, radiant Clara to the demanding Fosca, who pursues him with an obsessiveness to rival the revenge fixation of Sweeney Todd. If this is, on the surface, a most improbable transition, it also feels inevitable here, as Giorgio arrives at the realization that ‘love within reason is not love at all’ . . . but I didn't stop to think that I was listening to songs. I was hearing thought. And at moments, I was hearing a distillation of pure emotion."

Awards and nominations

Original Broadway production

Original London production

2010 London revival

2013 Off-Broadway Revival

References

Original Broadway Cast Album booklet

External links
 
Passion, Stephen Sondheim Reference Guide
17 scenes, sondheimguide.com 
castalbums.org
Passion, Music Theatre International
Passion – A musical by Stephen Sondheim and James Lapine
How Passion changed during its difficult previews, 1994 article from The Sondheim Review.

1994 musicals
Broadway musicals
Musicals based on films
Musicals based on novels
One-act musicals
Musicals by James Lapine
Musicals by Stephen Sondheim
Tony Award for Best Musical
Tony Award-winning musicals